The Inverell Argus was a semi-weekly English language newspaper published in Inverell, New South Wales.

History 
The newspaper operated between 1874 until 1927 when it was sold to Sommerlad's Northern Newspapers Pty Ltd, who absorbed it into the Inverell Times. The paper's proprietors were its editor Alfred Peter (Bert) Mudge (1876-1954) and A.J. Easau. In 1912, E.C. Sommerlad became editor when he moved over from the competing paper Inverell Times.

Digitisation 
The paper has been digitised as part of the Australian Newspapers Digitisation Program of the National Library of Australia.

See also 
 List of newspapers in Australia
 List of newspapers in New South Wales

References

External links 

Defunct newspapers published in New South Wales
Newspapers on Trove